Andradina is a municipality of the state of São Paulo, Brazil.

The municipality can be accessed mainly by Rodovia Marechal Cândido Rondon/BR-300 (Marechal Rondon highway).

References

Populated places established in 1937
Municipalities in São Paulo (state)